Vendôme Battery, also known as Ta' Maċċu Battery, is an artillery battery near Armier Bay, limits of Mellieħa, Malta. It was built by the Order of Saint John in 1715–1716 as one of a series of coastal fortifications around the Maltese Islands.

History
Vendôme Battery was built in 1715–1716 as part of the first building programme of coastal batteries in Malta. It was part of a chain of fortifications that defended the northern coast of Malta, which also included Aħrax Tower, several batteries, redoubts and entrenchments. The nearest fortifications to Vendôme Battery are Qortin Redoubt to the west and Crivelli Redoubt to the east.

The battery was named after Philippe de Vendôme, the Prior of France, who donated 40,000 scudi to construct batteries and redoubts around Malta's coastline. Several other fortifications were named after Vendôme, including a tour-reduit in Marsaxlokk and a number of redoubts.

Vendôme Battery was one of the largest batteries to be built in Malta. It has a semi-circular gun platform, having a parapet with nine embrasures. A blockhouse is located at the centre of the battery, and its land front contains a large redan. The entire structure is surrounded by a ditch and glacis.

The battery was armed with five 8-pounder and four 12-pounder iron guns in 1785. Later on, mortars were also installed in the battery.

Present day
Today, Vendôme Battery is still mostly intact, but is in a state of neglect. Its ditch is filled with soil and used to grow vegetables, while its walls are in a dilapidated state. Some stonework has been illegally removed to be used in the construction of nearby illegally built boathouses, which have also damaged the battery's relationship with the sea.

References

External links

National Inventory of the Cultural Property of the Maltese Islands

Batteries in Malta
Hospitaller fortifications in Malta
Military installations established in 1715
Mellieħa
Limestone buildings in Malta
National Inventory of the Cultural Property of the Maltese Islands
18th-century fortifications
1715 establishments in Malta
18th Century military history of Malta